The 1989 King of the Ring was the fifth annual King of the Ring professional wrestling tournament produced by the World Wrestling Federation (WWF, now WWE). The tournament was held on October 14, 1989 at the Providence Civic Center in Providence, Rhode Island as a special non-televised house show. The 1989 tournament was won by Tito Santana. A tournament was not held in 1990 but returned in 1991.

Production

Background
The King of the Ring tournament was an annual single-elimination tournament that was established by the World Wrestling Federation (WWF, now WWE) in 1985 with the winner being crowned the "King of the Ring." The 1989 tournament was the fifth King of the Ring tournament. It was held on October 14, 1989 at the Providence Civic Center in Providence, Rhode Island and like the previous years, it was a special non-televised house show.

Storylines
The matches resulted from scripted storylines, where wrestlers portrayed heroes, villains, or less distinguishable characters in scripted events that built tension and culminated in a wrestling match or series of matches. Results were predetermined by World Wrestling Federation's writers.

Aftermath
Although the King of the Ring tournament had been held annually since 1985, a tournament did not occur in 1990. However, the tournament returned in 1991.

Results

Tournament bracket

1.  Bill Woods substituted for Hillbilly Jim
2.  Nikolai Volkoff substituted for Barry Windham

References

1989
1989 in professional wrestling
1989 in Rhode Island
Events in Rhode Island
Professional wrestling in Providence, Rhode Island
October 1989 events in the United States